Kegelite is a complex silicate mineral with formula Pb8Al4Si8O20(SO4)2(CO3)4(OH)8.

It was first described in 1975 for an occurrence in the Tsumeb Mine, Tsumeb, Otjikoto Region, Namibia and named for Friedrich Wilhelm Kegel (?-1948), Director of mining operations at Tsumeb.
It occurs in a deeply oxidized polymetallic ore deposits in Tsumeb. Associated minerals include quartz, galena, mimetite, hematite, leadhillite, anglesite, fleischerite, melanotekite and alamosite. It has also been reported from the Zeehan district in Tasmania and from Tune, Sarpsberg, Østfold, Norway.

References

Phyllosilicates
Sulfate minerals
Carbonate minerals
Lead minerals
Monoclinic minerals